The Discover Syria Rally is an annual rally race, organized by the Syrian Automobile Club since 2003. The race is open to amateur and professional entries, and is classified as a Ranger Rally.
The rally aims to promote tourism in Syria. It is about 1300 km long, where the contestants drive between Syrian cities, and discover some of many ancient monuments and tourist sites within an interesting sporting frame. The event has not been held since 2009.

External links
 Rally Discover Syria Official Website (Arabic, English)

Rally competitions in Syria